Storm of the Century, alternatively known as Stephen King's Storm of the Century, is a 1999 American horror television miniseries written by Stephen King and directed by Craig R. Baxley. Unlike many other television adaptations of King's work, Storm of the Century was not based on a novel but was an original screenplay written by the author and directly produced for television. King described the screenplay as a "novel for television." The screenplay was published as a mass-market book in February 1999 prior to the TV broadcast of the mini-series.

King has called Storm of the Century his personal favorite of all the TV productions related to his works.

Plot
As the people of Little Tall Island, Maine prepare for a powerful blizzard in 1989, elderly resident Martha Clarendon is brutally murdered by a menacing stranger. Town manager Robbie Beals investigates, and the stranger terrifies him by relating shameful secrets from his past. Mike Anderson, a supermarket manager and part-time constable, arrests the stranger, who identifies himself as André Linoge. Linoge seems to know the names and morbid secrets of all the island's residents, and is particularly interested in Mike's son Ralphie, who has a birthmark on his nose. Yet he gives no hint of his own background, saying only, "Give me what I want, and I'll go away." While sitting in a jail cell, Linoge possesses the minds of several townspeople, causing suicides and a murder. He then escapes the jail in the form of a wizened old man and repeats his demand before disappearing into the storm.

The residents take shelter from the storm in the town hall. As they sleep, Linoge appears on the televisions as a televangelist and lectures them on the consequences of refusing to accommodate a stranger. The residents have the same dream in which authorities find the island deserted after the storm and the word "Croaton" carved on a tree. A news reporter connects the disappearance to the lost Roanoke colony. Meanwhile Mike dreams that the townspeople walk into the ocean and drown. The next day, Linoge causes three residents to vanish while everyone is watching the lighthouse collapse. Two die and the third, Angie Carver, is discovered alive but visibly aged. Ralphie goes missing and, when found in a closet, says that he was with Linoge. With each death and abduction, Linoge sends his demand again.

The town's children fall under a spell and go to sleep, dreaming that they are flying through the clouds with Linoge. That evening Mike finds Linoge inside the town hall holding a resident hostage. Amused by Mike's sympathy for the townspeople, Linoge says that they are all sinners and criminals who merely pretend to be decent. He tells Mike to arrange a town meeting at 9:00 that night and escapes again. When the meeting gathers, Linoge tells the residents that he has lived thousands of years and, having grown old, he wants a child whom he can raise to be a sorcerer like him. He cannot take a child by force, but the dream that the residents had will come true if they refuse. He leaves them to debate for half an hour. Mike urges the people to stand up to Linoge and is horrified when all of them, even his wife Molly, decide to give in. Linoge returns and presides over a lottery in which Ralphie is chosen. Taking his natural form once more, Linoge thanks the residents, walks out of the town hall with Ralphie in his arms and flies into the night sky.

In an epilogue, Mike leaves Little Tall and becomes a United States Marshal in San Francisco. Molly divorces and remarries to Alton "Hatch" Hatcher, his deputy constable. Some residents succumb to their guilt and commit suicide. Years later, Linoge and Ralphie walk past Mike in Chinatown, Ralphie having become corrupted and evil. Mike considers telling Molly what happened, but knows that it is better kept a secret.

Cast

Screenplay
The screenplay for the miniseries was written by Stephen King expressly for television. The screenplay was published as a mass-market book by Pocket Books just prior to the initial airing of Storm of the Century on ABC. The book included photographs of the TV mini-series. The book contains an introduction in which King describes the genesis of the idea as it occurred to him in late 1996. Beginning to write it in December 1996, he initially debated if the story should be either a novel or a screenplay. He described the result as a "novel for television." A hardcover edition, written as a screenplay rather than "prose", was published concurrently by the Book of the Month Club.

Release and reception
Storm of the Century aired on ABC on February 14–18, 1999. It was released on DVD on June 22 the same year.

On Rotten Tomatoes, the film holds an approval rating of 82% based on 22 reviews, with an average rating of 7.33/10. The website's critical consensus reads, "Chilling performances and an even darker moral dilemma shelter Storm of the Century's somewhat long-winded tale from ever being anything less than watchable."

U.S. Television Ratings:

See also
 Media based on Stephen King works

References

External links

1999 television films
1999 films
1999 American television series debuts
1999 American television series endings
1990s American television miniseries
Films directed by Craig R. Baxley
Saturn Award-winning television series
Television series set on fictional islands
Television shows set in Maine
Television shows set in San Francisco
Television series by Lionsgate Television
Television series by Warner Bros. Television Studios
Demons in television
Television shows written by Stephen King